ㅡ (eu) is one of the Korean hangul vowels. that pronounced like the IPA sound [ɯ] - the close back unrounded vowel.
The Unicode for the letter "ㅡ" is U+3161.

Stroke order

Hangul jamo
Vowel letters